The John Patton Log Cabin is a log home located in Lexington Park District Park in Lexington, Illinois. The home was built in 1829 by John Patton, an early settler of McLean County. Patton, who was originally from Switzerland County, Indiana, came to a Kickapoo village in the area; he built his cabin with the tribe's assistance three months after his arrival. After McLean County was incorporated in 1831, the cabin became one of its first polling places. The cabin is now the only surviving early government building in the county as well as the only remnant of European interactions with Native Americans. The City of Lexington renovated the cabin in 1969 and now uses it as a museum.

The building was added to the National Register of Historic Places on August 1, 1986.

References

External links
 Patton Cabin Collection, McLean County Museum of History

Houses in McLean County, Illinois
National Register of Historic Places in McLean County, Illinois
Log cabins in the United States
Houses completed in 1829
Houses on the National Register of Historic Places in Illinois
Log buildings and structures on the National Register of Historic Places in Illinois